Cohors II Hispanorum peditata was an auxilia infantry cohort of the Imperial Roman army. The cohort, was based in the castellum of Traiectum on the Limes Germanicus in the Roman province of Germania Inferior.

References

See also 
 List of Roman auxiliary regiments

Military of ancient Rome
Auxiliary peditata units of ancient Rome
Germania Inferior
Netherlands in the Roman era